This is a list of lists of cast members of television series.

A 
 List of All That cast members
 List of The Andy Griffith Show guest stars
 List of Ang Probinsyano guest stars
 List of Are You Afraid of the Dark? cast members
 List of Arrested Development cast members
 List of Arrowverse cast members
 List of The Avengers and The New Avengers cast members
 List of Arrowverse cast members
 List of Awake cast members

B 
 List of Batman television series cast members
 List of previous The Bold and the Beautiful cast members

C 
 List of Chuck cast members
 List of CID (Indian TV series) cast members
 List of cast members from The City (2008 TV series)
 List of comedy and variety television programs with LGBT cast members
 List of Curb Your Enthusiasm guest stars

D 
 List of Dallas (1978 TV series) cast members
 List of Dalziel and Pascoe cast members
 List of DC Extended Universe cast members
 List of The Den cast members
 List of Desperate Housewives cast members
 List of Doctor Who cast members

E 
 List of El Señor de los Cielos cast members
 List of En otra piel cast members
 List of Ex on the Beach cast members

F 
 List of Family Affairs cast members
 List of Family Guy guest stars
 List of Fawlty Towers cast members

G 
 List of Gargoyles cast members
 List of Geordie Shore cast members
 List of Gimme Gimme Gimme cast members
 List of previous General Hospital cast members
 List of Gogglebox cast members
 List of Goin' Bulilit cast members
 List of Grey's Anatomy cast members
 List of Gunsmoke cast members

H 
 List of Hellraiser cast members
 List of Heroes cast members
 List of Highlander cast members
 List of The Hills cast members

I 
 List of In Living Color cast members
 List of In Plain Sight cast members

J 
 List of Jackass cast members
 List of Journeyman cast members

K 
 List of guest stars on King of the Hill

L 
 List of Laguna Beach: The Real Orange County cast members
 List of The Larry Sanders Show guest stars
 List of Leave It to Beaver cast members
 List of Les Rois maudits cast members and episodes
 List of Lost cast members

M 
 List of Mad TV cast members
 List of Made in Chelsea cast members
 List of Malhação cast members
 List of Marido en alquiler cast members
 List of M*A*S*H cast members
 List of Monk cast members
 List of Morangos com Açúcar cast members
 List of My Love from the Star (2017 TV series) guest stars
 List of MythBusters cast members

N 
 List of Nashville cast members
 List of Non-Summit cast members

O 
 List of The Office (American TV series) characters
 List of Once Upon a Time cast members

P 
 List of Pari 'Koy guest stars
 List of Passions characters and cast
 List of Percy Jackson & the Olympians cast members
 List of Police Academy cast members
 List of Prison Break cast members
 List of Prisoner cast members

R 
 List of The Real Housewives cast members
 List of Real World cast members
 List of reality television programs with LGBT cast members

S 
 List of Saturday Night Live cast members
 List of School series cast members
 List of Scream (TV series) cast members
 List of Señora Acero cast members
 List of Sliders cast members
 List of South Park cast members
 List of SpongeBob SquarePants cast members
 List of Star Trek: Deep Space Nine cast members
 List of Star Trek: Discovery cast members
 List of Star Trek: Enterprise cast members
 List of Star Trek: The Next Generation cast members
 List of Star Trek: The Original Series cast members
 List of The Sullivans cast members
 List of Sunset Beach cast members

T 
 List of Texas cast members
 List of That '70s Show cast members
 List of Tierra de reyes cast members
 List of Tinker Bell cast members
 List of Toda Max guest stars
 List of The Twilight Zone (1959 TV series) guest stars

U 
 List of Ugly Betty cast members

V 
 List of cast members of Verbotene Liebe

W 
 List of Warsaw Shore cast members
 List of WWE Raw guest stars

See also
 Lists of actors